Graignes is a former commune in the Manche département of the Basse-Normandie region of Northern France. On 28 February 2007, it was merged with the commune of Le Mesnil-Angot to form Graignes-Mesnil-Angot.

See also
Battle of Graignes

References

Former communes of Manche

es:Graignes